Alan Kleier an engineer and business executive.

History 
Alan Kleir studied mechanical engineering and worked for Texaco and Chevron, first as a petroleum engineer. He assumed different leadership positions and was the General Director for Chevron Corporation's operations in Angola.

Kleier met with Marco Nhunga, Deputy General of the IDA (Instituto de Desenvolvimento Agrário), Cynthia G. Efird, the United States Ambassador to Angola, and Estevão Rodrigues, Director of CLUSA in Angola, in Benguela province on March 1, 2007. He retired from Chevron in 2013.

See also
 Angolagate
 Angolan Civil War

References

Living people
Year of birth missing (living people)